Hendthighelbedi is a 1989 Indian Kannada-language comedy thriller film, written and directed by Dinesh Babu. It stars Anant Nag and Mahalakshmi. The supporting cast features Sundar Krishna Urs, Devaraj, Tara and Bangalore Nagesh. The film's score and soundtrack were composed by Vijayanand.

Set in Murnad, in the Kodagu region of Karnataka, the film tells the story of how Anand (Nag), a businessman and a meek husband of Chitra (Mahalakshmi), goes about tackling with double murder that he is wrongly accused of, by his friend and the culprit Srinivas (Urs). The film, upon release, received favorable reviews. At the 37th Filmfare Awards South, Nag was awarded the Best Actor.

Cast 
 Anant Nag as Anand Somashekhar Somavarpet
 Mahalakshmi as Chitra
 Sundar Krishna Urs as Inspector Srinivas
 Devaraj as CID Inspector Prathap
 Bangalore Nagesh as Thimma
 Tara as Inspector Srinivas's wife 
 Anjali Sudhakar as Thimma's wife
 Disco Shanti as Shanti
 Sihi Kahi Geetha as Sarala
 Sarvamangala
 Roopa Prabhakar (credited as Baby Roopa) as Roopa
 Keerthi (credited Baby Keerthi) as Putti

Soundtrack 
The music was composed by Vijayanand and the audio was released on Lahari Music label.

Awards
37th Filmfare Awards South
 Best Actor — Anant Nag

References 

1989 films
1980s Kannada-language films
Indian comedy films
Films directed by Dinesh Baboo
Films scored by Vijayanand